Mohamed Amine Ksiaa Hamrouni (born 16 July 1997) is a Tunisian professional footballer who plays as a left-back for CS Sfaxien.

References

1997 births
Living people
Tunisian footballers
Association football fullbacks
Tunisian Ligue Professionnelle 1 players
CO Médenine players
Stade Gabèsien players
US Ben Guerdane players
CS Sfaxien players